Ernest Wu is an engineer with IBM Microelectronics- Avent, Inc. in Burlington, Vermont. He was named a Fellow of the Institute of Electrical and Electronics Engineers (IEEE) in 2016 for his contributions to gate oxide reliability of CMOS devices.

References 

Fellow Members of the IEEE
Living people
21st-century American engineers
Year of birth missing (living people)